Soltando al Perro (English: Letting the Dog Go) is the first live album released by Jesse & Joy. Launched by Warner Music Mexico on March 25, 2014, it includes a DVD documenting the ¿Con Quién Se Queda El Perro? Tour, as well as the music video for the song "Me Quiero Enamorar". "Mi Tesoro" served as the opening theme for the novela Qué pobres tan ricos starring Jaime Camil and Zuria Vega.

Track listing

Additional tracks

DVD

References

Jesse & Joy live albums
2014 live albums
Spanish-language live albums
Warner Music Group live albums